John Christopher Burton Dawnay, 5th Viscount Downe (15 November 1764 – 18 February 1832), styled The Honourable John Dawnay until 1780, was a British Whig politician.

Dawnay was the eldest son of John Dawnay, 4th Viscount Downe, by Laura, daughter of William Burton, of Luffenham, Rutland. He succeeded his father in the viscountcy in 1780. However, as this was an Irish peerage it did not entitle him to a seat in the English House of Lords. He subsequently sat as Member of Parliament for Petersfield between 1787 and 1790 and for Wootton Basset between 1790 and 1796. The latter year he was created Baron Dawnay, of Cowick in the County of York, in the Peerage of Great Britain, which gave him a seat in the House of Lords.

Lord Downe was twice married. He married firstly a daughter of Major John Scott of Balconie. After her death in 1798 he married secondly  Louisa Maria, daughter of George Welstead, of Apsley, Sussex, in 1815. There were no children from the two marriages. Downe died in February 1832, aged 67. The barony of Dawnay died with him while he was succeeded in the viscountcy by his younger brother, Reverend William Henry Dawnay.

His widow spent her later years at Bowden Hall in Upton St Leonards, where she endowed the local primary school. The Viscountess Downe died in March 1867.

References

External links

1764 births
1832 deaths
British MPs 1784–1790
British MPs 1790–1796
Viscounts in the Peerage of Ireland
Peers of Great Britain created by George III
Members of the Parliament of Great Britain for English constituencies
Whig (British political party) MPs
John